Townville is a borough in Crawford County, Pennsylvania, United States. The population was 328 at the 2020 census, up from 323 at the 2010 census.

History
Townville was founded in 1824 by Noah Town, and named for him.

Geography
Townville is located in eastern Crawford County at  (41.679679, -79.881731). It is surrounded by Steuben Township, a separate municipality.

Pennsylvania Route 408 passes through the borough, leading east  to Hydetown and northwest  to Cambridge Springs.

Natural Features
The borough is in a valley at the height of land between north-flowing Muddy Creek and south-flowing Sugar Creek, both tributaries of French Creek and part of the Allegheny River watershed.

Demographics

As of the census of 2000, there were 306 people, 119 households, and 94 families residing in the borough. The population density was 535.3 people per square mile (207.3/km²). There were 125 housing units at an average density of 218.7 per square mile (84.7/km²). The racial makeup of the borough was 99.02% White, 0.33% Asian, 0.33% from other races, and 0.33% from two or more races. Hispanic or Latino of any race were 0.33% of the population.

There were 119 households, out of which 34.5% had children under the age of 18 living with them, 70.6% were married couples living together, 7.6% had a female householder with no husband present, and 20.2% were non-families. 17.6% of all households were made up of individuals, and 7.6% had someone living alone who was 65 years of age or older. The average household size was 2.57 and the average family size was 2.93.

In the borough the population was spread out, with 26.8% under the age of 18, 3.6% from 18 to 24, 27.5% from 25 to 44, 22.5% from 45 to 64, and 19.6% who were 65 years of age or older. The median age was 39 years. For every 100 females there were 97.4 males. For every 100 females age 18 and over, there were 88.2 males.

The median income for a household in the borough was $35,833, and the median income for a family was $37,500. Males had a median income of $30,417 versus $21,458 for females. The per capita income for the borough was $18,095. None of the families and 1.4% of the population were living below the poverty line, including no under eighteens and 3.3% of those over 64.

References

Populated places established in 1831
Boroughs in Crawford County, Pennsylvania